National Trail may refer to

one of the National Trails, long-distance hiking trails in England and Wales
a trail in the National Trails System in the United States
The National Trail, a multi-use trail in Australia
National Trail High School, Ohio, United States
National Trail Raceway, a dragstrip in Ohio, United States

See also 
Israel National Trail, a hiking trail